Viñolas is a surname. Notable people with the surname include:

Albert Ramos Viñolas (born 1988), Spanish tennis player
Javier Viñolas (born 1971), Spanish rowing coxswain